Dubino (Dübìn in lombard) is a comune (municipality) in the Province of Sondrio in the Italian region Lombardy, located about  northeast of Milan and about  west of Sondrio.

Dubino borders the following municipalities: Andalo Valtellino, Cino, Delebio, Gera Lario, Mantello, Novate Mezzola, Piantedo, Sorico, Verceia.

Demographic evolution

References

Cities and towns in Lombardy